Steadfast may refer to:

Steadfast (John Hicks album), 1991
Steadfast (Forefather album), 2008
RSS Steadfast, stealth frigate of the Republic of Singapore Navy
USCGC Steadfast (WMEC-623), a United States coast guard cutter
Steadfast, Belize, a village in Stann Creek District, Belize
List of people known as the Steadfast, a list of people with the epithet of the Steadfast